River of Gold is a 1998 Portuguese drama film directed by Paulo Rocha. It was screened in the Un Certain Regard section at the 1998 Cannes Film Festival.

Cast
 Isabel Ruth - Carolina
 Lima Duarte - António
 Joana Bárcia - Mélita
 João Cardoso - Zé dos Ouros
 José Mário Branco - Blindman
 António Capelo - Joaquim
 Filipe Cochofel - João
 António João Rodrigues - Boy
 Alice Silva - Laundry Woman
 Vitalina Beleza - Laundry Woman
 Absinte Abramovici - Laundry Woman
 Joana Mayer - Laundry Woman
 Saguenail - Photographer
 Maria José Marinho - Godmother
 Marco Fernandes - Man
 Pedro Santos - Violin Boy
 Diana Sá - Flower Saleswoman
 João Pedro Bénard

References

External links

1998 films
1990s Portuguese-language films
1998 drama films
Portuguese drama films
Films directed by Paulo Rocha